Kumbhalgarh (literally "Kumbhal fort"), also known as the Great Wall of India, is a Mewar fortress on the westerly range of Aravalli Hills, just about 48 km from Rajsamand city in the Rajsamand district of the Rajasthan state in western India. It is located about 84 km from Udaipur. It is a World Heritage Site included in Hill Forts of Rajasthan. It was built during the 15th century by Rana Kumbha.

In 2013, at the 37th session of the World Heritage Committee held in Phnom Penh, Cambodia, Kumbhalgarh Fort, along with five other forts of Rajasthan, was declared a UNESCO World Heritage Site under the group Hill Forts of Rajasthan.

The chief architect who built this fort was Mandan, who documented his style of work in his text, Rajvallabh.

The fort is among the largest fort complexes in the world.

History 

The early history of the fort could not be ascertained on account of lack of evidence. Before Rana Kumbha built the new fort, there was a small fort, limited to small hilly area,  believed to have been built by King Samprati of the Maurya and was known as Matsyaendra Durg. Rana Lakha won this entire area and plains of Godwar from  Chauhan Rajputs of Nadol in late 14th century.

Kumbhalgarh, as the fort we see it was built by Rana Kumbha who was the Rana of Mewar from the Sisodia rajput clan. Rana Kumbha took the aid of the famous architect of the era, "Mandan". Rana Kumbha's kingdom of Mewar stretched from Ranthambore to Gwalior and included large tracts of what is now Madhya Pradesh and Rajasthan.  Out of the 84 forts in his dominion, Rana Kumbha is said to have built 32 of them, of which Kumbhalgarh is the largest and most elaborate.

Kumbhalgarh also separated Mewar and Marwar from each other and was used as a place of refuge for the rulers of Mewar at times of danger. A notable instance was in the case of Prince Udai, the infant king of Mewar who was smuggled here in 1535, when Chittor was under siege. Prince Udai later succeeded to the throne. The fort remained impregnable to direct assault.

Ahmed Shah I of Gujarat attacked the fort in 1457, but found the effort futile. There was a local belief then that the Banmata deity in the fort protected it and hence he destroyed the temple. There were further attempts in 1458–59 and 1467 by Mahmud Khalji, but it also proved futile. Akbar's general, Shahbaz Khan, attacked this fort in October 1577 and after the siege of 6 months, he was able to capture the fort in April 1577. But it was recaptured by Pratap in 1578. In 1818, an armed band of sanyasis formed a garrison to protect the fort, but was convinced by James Tod and the fort was taken over by the British and later returned to Udaipur State. There were additions made by Maharanas of Mewar, but the original structure built by Maharana Kumbha remains. The residential buildings and temples are well-preserved. The fort is also known to be the birthplace of Maharana Pratap.

Architecture

The frontal walls are fifteen feet thick. Kumbhalgarh has seven fortified gateways. There are over 70 temples within the fort, both Jain and Hindu Temples. From the palace top, it is possible to see Kilometres into the Aravalli Range.

Important structures in the fort

Aaret Pol was the first entry gate of the fort. Halla Pol is on the downward slope from the entrance. Just after Halla Pol is Badshahi Bavdi, a stepped tank, built after the invasion of Shahbaz Khan in 1578, the general of Mughal emperor Akbar to provide water to the troops. 

Hanuman Pol, the next gate is half a KM away from Halla Pol. Hanuman Pol is a double-storeyed gate with octagonal bastions. The gate got its name from the stone image of Hanuman located in front of the gate, which was brought by Maharana Kumbha.

Ram Pol is the main entrance of the fort, there is another entrance towards the east, called Vijay Pol.

There are five more gates between Ram Pol to Badal Mahal, the Palace built on the highest point of the fort. Names of these gates are Bhairon Pol, Nimboo Pol, Chaugan Pol, Pagda Pol and Ganesh Pol.

Most buildings are visible from the Ram Pol, which is considered an architectural specimen. 

Hindu Temple
 Ganesha temple - Situated on the left of the Ram Pol, this temple was built by Maharana Kumbha and the image of Ganesha is enshrined in the sanctum. Standing on a high platform entered through a flight of steps from the south. The sanctum has decorated curvilinear brick sikhar while mandapa and mukhamandapa have a domical ceiling. 

 Charbhuja temple - Dedicated to the four-armed goddess, this temple is just on the hill slope on the right side of Ganesha Temple. It is raised over a high platform and enclosed by a wall with an entrance from the east.

 Neel Kanth Mahadeva temple is located on the eastern side of the fort built during 1458 CE. The central shrine of Shiva is approached through a rectangular enclosure and through a structure supported by 24 huge pillars. The idol of Shiva is made of black stone and is depicted with 12 hands. The inscriptions indicate that the temple was renovated by Rana Sanga.

 Mataji temple, also called Kheda Devi temple is located on the southern side of Neela Kanth temple. 
 There are 5 Hindu temples in Golera group of temples. 

 Mamadeo temple. Cenotaph of  Kunwar Prithviraj, elder brother of Rana Sanga is near to this temple. 

 Surya Mandir (Sun temple)

Jain Temple
 Parsva Natha temple (built during 1513), Jain temple on the eastern side and Bawan (52) Jain temples.
 There are 4 Jain Temples in the Golera group of temples.  
 2 Jain Temples near Vijay Pol

 Juna Bhilwara Temple
 Pital Shah Jain temple

Culture
The Rajasthan Tourism Department organises a three-day annual festival in the fort in remembrance of the passion of Maharana Kumbha towards art and architecture. Sound and light shows are organised with the fort as the background. Various concerts and dance events are also organised to commemorate the function. The other events during the festival are Heritage Fort Walk, turban tying, tug-of war and mehendi mandana among others.

Six forts of Rajasthan, namely, Amber Fort, Chittor Fort, Gagron Fort, Jaisalmer Fort, Kumbhalgarh and Ranthambore Fort were included in the UNESCO World Heritage Site list during the 37th meeting of the World Heritage Committee in Phnom Penh during June 2013. They were recognized as a serial cultural property and examples of Rajput military hill architecture.

See also 
 Kumbhalgarh Wildlife Sanctuary

Notes

References

External links

 Kumbhalgarh: The Great Wall of India (Photo essay 2012)
 Kumbhalgarh Fort of Rajasthan
 Article on Kumbhalgarh Fort

Rajput architecture
Forts in Rajasthan
Mewar
Tourist attractions in Rajsamand district
World Heritage Sites in India